Protoparmeliopsis is a genus of crustose lichens in the family Lecanoraceae. It has about 20 species. The genus was circumscribed by French botanist Maurice Choisy in 1929.

Species
Protoparmeliopsis achariana 
Protoparmeliopsis admontensis 
Protoparmeliopsis baranowii 
Protoparmeliopsis bipruinosa 
Protoparmeliopsis bogdoensis 
Protoparmeliopsis bolcana 
Protoparmeliopsis chejuensis 
Protoparmeliopsis chlorophthalma 
Protoparmeliopsis degelii 
Protoparmeliopsis dispersoareolata 
Protoparmeliopsis ertzii 
Protoparmeliopsis esfahanensis 
Protoparmeliopsis garovaglii 
Protoparmeliopsis geiserae 
Protoparmeliopsis graeca 
Protoparmeliopsis gyrophorica 
Protoparmeliopsis hieroglyphica 
Protoparmeliopsis klauskalbii 
Protoparmeliopsis kofae 
Protoparmeliopsis kopachevskae 
Protoparmeliopsis kotovii 
Protoparmeliopsis kukunorensis 
Protoparmeliopsis laatokkensis 
Protoparmeliopsis macrocyclos 
Protoparmeliopsis mazatzalensis 
Protoparmeliopsis muralis 
Protoparmeliopsis nashii 
Protoparmeliopsis orbicularis 
Protoparmeliopsis peltata 
Protoparmeliopsis pinguis 
Protoparmeliopsis sierrae 
Protoparmeliopsis sphaeroidea 
Protoparmeliopsis straminea 
Protoparmeliopsis taranii 
Protoparmeliopsis usbekica 
Protoparmeliopsis vaenskaei 
Protoparmeliopsis verruculifera 
Protoparmeliopsis zareii 
Protoparmeliopsis zerovii

References

Lecanorales
Lecanorales genera
Taxa described in 1929